Romey is a surname. Notable people with the surname include:

Ayse Romey, American-born German actress
Dick Romey (1905–1980), American football player
Raphaël Romey (born 1981), French footballer

See also
Comey (surname)
Romy (given name)
Romeyn
Romney (surname)